Maude Gabrielle Harcheb  (born 1 July 1987), better known by her mononymous name Maude, is a French singer and dancer who took part in season 5 of the popular French reality television series Les Anges de la téléréalité broadcast on NRJ 12 channel. Maude's first album #HoldUp was released on 1 September 2014.

Life and career 
Originating from Kabyle and Sicilian roots, she studied literature. 
From an early age, she devoted herself to her first passion: dance. She started early, doing ballet and modern jazz. However, she very quickly decided to focus on singing. At 16, she started taking classes to improve her singing and to get closer to her dream of becoming a singer.
In March 2013 she appeared on Les Anges de la téléréalité as an "anonymous angel" pursuing the goal of making a hit record in the United States. She recorded Love Is What You Make of It in a Fort Lauderdale (Florida) studio, a song produced and written by Richard Zahniser and Tommy Hubbard charted in France after released on 16 April 2013.

In July 2013, in a special program titled Les Anges de la Téléréalité 5: Les Retrouvailles, it was announced that Maude would return to the United States to record a full studio album due to the success of the song. Her second single Love Not Money was featured in the French Top 20, which allowed her to be nominated as Révélation francophone de l'année for the NRJ Music Awards 2014. 

In 2014 Maude returned with Cool, which was co-written by the team that gave her her first hit.
In 2014, she also appeared on a special version of Trumpets with Jason Derulo, which was widely broadcast in France. She then released the single Rise Up..
Maude's first album #HoldUp was released on 1 September 2014. 
In June 2015, Maude released a new single Jamais and she announced that her new album Poparoïdwould be released in September 25. 

On 2 June 2017, she released a new single Looking for Peace. The music video (directed by Anthony Ghnassia) was released on August 25.

In 2020,  Maude released two news songs Love Dies and Pas Normal, as the first two singles of her 2021 EP Unfamous. The third single of the extended-play, Sérieux, was released in March 2021. The singer described this project as her most personal work to date.

In addition to her career in music, Maude published her first book in October 2020, titled La grossesse : toute la vérité, rien que la vérité: Le premier livre écrit par des femmes enceintes pour des femmes enceintes, which translates as "a book written by pregnant women for pregnant women."

Filmography

Television 
 2013 : Les Anges de la télé réalité 5 : Welcome to Florida
 2013 : Les Anges de la télé réalité 5 : Les Retrouvailles
 2014 : Les Anges de la télé réalité 6 : Australia

Music videos 
 2013 : Love Is What You Make of It
 2013 : Love Not Money
 2014 : Cool
 2014 : Trumpets (with Jason Derulo)
 2014 : Rise Up
 2014 : Seule
 2014 : A l'attaque (with Romy M)
 2015 : Donne-moi le la (with Big Ali)
 2015 : Jamais
 2017 : Looking For Peace
 2020 : Love Dies
 2020 : Pas Normal
 2021 : Sérieux

Discography

Albums

EPs

Singles
Songs as a lead artist

*Did not appear in the official Belgian Ultratop 50 charts, but rather in the bubbling under Ultratip charts.

Other releases

2014: "Ouragan" (from the compilation album Les Enfants du Top 50)
2015: "Danse ta vie" (feat. Vitaa) (from the compilation album Les Stars Font Leur Cinéma)
2015: "Tu me donnes le tourni" (feat. Kévin Lyttle) (from the compilation album Touche Pas à Ma Zik)
2015: "Tant Que Les Modes" (gift for fans free-download at http://www.maudeofficial.com/)

Awards and nominations

References

External links
Maude Twitter Page
Maude's official website
Blog Star skyrock

1987 births
Living people
21st-century French singers
21st-century French women singers